Hillman is an outer southern suburb of Perth, the capital city of Western Australia, located within the City of Rockingham. It is principally a suburb of residential dwellings, and contains Hillman Primary School.

The suburb was created and named in 1970 after Alfred Hillman, a draughtsman, surveyor and explorer, who arrived in Western Australia in 1831 and made many initial surveys in the Rockingham area. On 7 May 2009, a boundary realignment of Cooloongup and Hillman approved by the Minister for Lands incorporated the Rockingham Train Station into Rockingham.

A significant portion of the north and east portions of the suburb is incorporated into Rockingham Lakes Regional Park.

References

Suburbs of Perth, Western Australia
Suburbs in the City of Rockingham